Enquist is a surname of Swedish origin which may refer to:

Jan Enquist, Swedish rear admiral
Jeff Enquist, American soccer player
Lynn W. Enquist, American professor in molecular biology
Oskar Enquist, Imperial Russian vice admiral of Swedish descent
Paul Enquist,  American Olympic rower
Per Olov Enquist, Swedish dramatist, playwright and novelist
Sue Enquist, American softball player/coach

See also
 Enqvist

Swedish-language surnames